Rafael Nadal defeated Dominic Thiem in the final, 7–6(10–8), 6–4 to win the men's singles tennis title at the 2017 Madrid Open. It was his record fifth Madrid Open title and record-equaling 30th Masters singles title.

Novak Djokovic was the defending champion, but lost in the semifinals to Nadal.

Seeds
The top eight seeds receive a bye into the second round.

Draw

Finals

Top half

Section 1

Section 2

Bottom half

Section 3

Section 4

Qualifying

Seeds

Qualifiers

Lucky losers

Qualifying draw

First qualifier

Second qualifier

Third qualifier

Fourth qualifier

Fifth qualifier

Sixth qualifier

Seventh qualifier

References 
 Main Draw
 Qualifying Draw

Men's Singles